Fields/Church of Broken Glass is the fourth studio album by the progressive metal band Hammers of Misfortune, released in 2008. It consists of two concept albums of smaller length, Fields and Church of Broken Glass. The band has commented that the album is "a split with (their)selves".

Track listing

Fields track list
 Agriculture (5:04)
 Fields (4:45)
 Motorcade (6:21)
 Rats Assembly (6:10)
 Always Looking Down (5:33)
 Too Soon (8:35)

Church Of Broken Glass track list
 Almost (Left Without You) (8:18)
 Butchertown (10:19)
 The Gulls (6:35)
 Church of Broken Glass (4:19)
 Train (4:02)

Musicians 
 John Cobbett - guitars
 Sigrid Sheie - organ, piano, flute, backing vocals
 Chewy Marzolo - drums, percussions
 Jesse Quattro - vocals
 Patrick Goodwin - vocals
 Ron Nichols - bass guitar

2008 albums
Hammers of Misfortune albums